Sir Robert "Bobby" Charlton  is a former association footballer who made 106 appearances for England between 1958 and 1970. He is England's third all-time goalscorer, having scored 49 times for his country. He is generally regarded as one of the best midfielders of all-time, and was named the Ballon d'Or winner as European football's player of the year in 1966.

Charlton made his international debut for England in April 1958, scoring a goal against Scotland that was described by The Timess football correspondent Geoffrey Green as "surely one of the finest ever seen at Hampden". He was a prolific goalscorer for England in his first thirteen months, scoring at a rate of a-goal-a-game, culminating with his first hat-trick in international football, against the United States in May 1959. He scored his 31st international goal in October 1963 during a 4–0 victory over Wales, and in doing so, became England's top goalscorer, passing the previous record jointly held by Tom Finney and Nat Lofthouse. He subsequently lost the record to his teammate Jimmy Greaves in October 1964, but regained it when he scored his 45th goal in May 1968. He scored his final international goal during a 4–0 win against Colombia in May 1970, and retired from international football after England were knocked out of the 1970 FIFA World Cup. He remained England's leading goalscorer until September 2015, when he was surpassed by Wayne Rooney.

Charlton scored four international hat-tricks; in addition to the one against the United States, he scored three goals in a game against Luxembourg during the 1962 FIFA World Cup qualifiers, and in friendlies against Mexico and Switzerland. He scored more goals against Northern Ireland than any other team, with six goals, while he scored five goals against each of Luxembourg, Portugal, Scotland and Wales. Of Charlton's 49 goals, 22 were scored in friendlies. In competitive matches, the majority of his goals came during British Home Championship matches. Charlton scored 16 times in these matches, including 3 in tournaments which doubled as qualification for UEFA Euro 1968. He scored four goals during FIFA World Cup tournaments, including three goals during the 1966 FIFA World Cup, which England won, collecting one during the group stage and both goals in England's 2–1 victory over Portugal in the semi-final.

International goals
England score listed first, score column indicates score after each Charlton goal.

Statistics

Notes

References

Goals
Goals
Charlton, Bobby